Norman Angus McLean (19 December 1896 – 19 December 1980) was an Australian rules footballer who played with Essendon in the Victorian Football League (VFL).

Notes

External links 

1896 births
1980 deaths
Australian rules footballers from Melbourne
Essendon Football Club players
People from Williamstown, Victoria